Teachings on birth control have changed over the course of the history of the Church of Jesus Christ of Latter-day Saints (LDS Church). Church leaders have gone from condemning it as sinful to allowing it. The current church stance as of 2023 is that "decisions about birth control and the consequences of those decisions rest solely with each married couple" and that they should consider "the physical and mental health of the mother and father and their capacity to provide the basic necessities of life for their children" when planning a family. Historically, the church discouraged surgical sterilization, like vasectomies and tubal ligation, and encouraged members to only use these options for serious medical conditions after discussing it with a bishop. In 2020, the church's General Handbook was modified and language regarding surgical sterilization softened. The current General Handbook states: "The Church discourages surgical sterilization as an elective form of birth control. Surgical sterilization includes procedures such as vasectomies and tubal ligations." The church states that elective abortions as a form of birth control are against God's commandments.

History
In the past the use of birth control methods including artificial contraception was explicitly condemned by LDS Church leaders. Beginning in July 1916, apostles were quoted stating that birth control was a "pernicious doctrine" and that "limiting the number of children in a family...is sinful". The first time that any approval of a non-abstinence fertility control method was publicly expressed occurred in a 1942 Improvement Era article in which apostle John A. Widtsoe mentioned the rhythm method as an acceptable means of spacing children. In his influential 1956 treatise Doctrines of Salvation, then apostle Joseph Fielding Smith called birth control a wickedness that leads to damnation and caused the downfall of nations. He further stated that an LDS couple that deliberately prevents themselves from having more children after their second or third child is guilty of iniquity which must be punished. The 1958 edition of Bruce R. McConkie's popular book Mormon Doctrine stated that all those using condoms or other artificial contraception are "in rebellion against God and are guilty of gross wickedness." The BYU Honor Code in 1968 stated that "the Church does not approve of any form of birth control." In 1969 the first and only First Presidency statement on birth control was released; it reemphasized that it was "contrary to the teachings of the Church artificially to curtail or prevent the birth of children", though, for the first time there was a clarification that men should be considerate to "conserve" the "health and strength" of their wives when planning families since they carry the "greater responsibility" for bearing and rearing children.

Other discussions of the topic include those by Ezra Taft Benson, who became a church president. He stated that those that advocate for birth control perpetuate types of government that cause famine, that couples should not prevent births for selfish reasons, and that a sterilization operation could "jeapordiz[e] your exaltation." As recently as 2003 a church manual was published containing a quote from the late church president Spencer W. Kimball stating that the church does not "condone nor approve of" measures of contraception which greatly "limit the family".

Church insurance and birth control
Before 2023 the church's insurance company Deseret Mutual Benefits Administrators which provides coverage for its employees did not cover any form of birth control. In 2023 the church company began covering many types of birth control except emergency contraception (i.e. the-morning-after pill). However, it still does not cover any sterilization (whether by vasectomy or tubal ligation) for a couple unless the woman has already had five children or is over forty.

References

Birth control
Church of Jesus Christ of Latter-day Saints
Birth control